Centrolepidaceae are a family of flowering plants now included in Restionaceae following APG IV (2016). The botanical name has been recognized by most taxonomists.

The APG II system, of 2003 (unchanged from the APG system, 1998), also recognised such a family, and assigned it to the order Poales in the clade commelinids in the monocots.

The family was regarded as containing three genera, Aphelia, Centrolepis, and Gaimardia, with about 35 species total, found in Australia, New Zealand, southern South America and Southeast Asia.

References

External links
Centrolepidaceae in western Australia
Aphelia in western Australia
Centrolepis in western Australia
links at CSDL, Texas
 Centrolepidaceae  in Flora of New Zealand.

 
Poales families
Historically recognized angiosperm families